Texas Dreams Gymnastics is a gymnastics training facility located in Coppell, Texas. It is owned by 1991 world champion and 1992 Olympics bronze medalist Kim Zmeskal-Burdette.

History
Texas Dreams opened on November 26, 2001, and has produced champions at the state, regional, national and international levels.

Notable Texas Dreams gymnasts
Among Texas Dreams' most successful athletes are:

Ragan Smith: 
 2016 Olympic team alternate
 2017 National Champion
 2017 World Championships team member
 2018 World Championships alternate
 National Team member (2014–19)
 Oklahoma Sooners (2020–23)

Emma Malabuyo:
 2020 Olympic team alternate
 National Team member (2016–19, 2021)
 2017 U.S. Classic Junior Champion
 UCLA Bruins (2021–24)

Sydney Barros: 
 2019 Junior World Championships bronze medalist
 National Team member (2018–2021)

Bailie Key: 
 National Team member (2011–15)
 2013 Junior National Champion
 2015 World Championships alternate
 University of Alabama (2018–19; medically retired)

Kennedy Baker: 
 National Team member (2010–13)
 2012 Olympic Trials competitor
 Florida Gators (2015–18)

Peyton Ernst: 
 National Team member (2012–14)
 2013 Tokyo World Cup silver medalist
 University of Florida (2015–16) & University of Alabama (2017–19)

Tiffany Tolnay: 
 Level 10 competitor
 University of Georgia

Lloimincia Hall: 
 J.O. Nationals qualifier
 Louisiana State University
 2013 SEC floor champion

Chelsea Davis: 
 National Team member (2010–11)
 2010 World Championships alternate
 University of Georgia

Veronica Hults: 
 National Team member (2013)

References

External links
 Texas Dreams Gymnastics
 USA Gymnastics

Companies based in Coppell, Texas
Gymnastics organizations
Gymnastics clubs
Gymnastics academies in the United States
Gymnastics clubs in the United States
Gymnastics venues in the Dallas–Fort Worth metroplex
Gymnastics in Texas
2001 establishments in Texas